Maharaj Bada or Jayaaji Chowk is one of the most significant place of Gwalior, Madhya Pradesh, India. Maharaj Bada, which is sometimes just called as Bada, is the central focus of Gwalior, with a large square, a former opera house, banks, tea, coffee and juice stands and a municipal market building.

Location
Thriving bazaars surround the chowk. There are several jewelry shops situated near Maharaj bada. It is one of the prime or important markets of Gwalior, as well as Madhya Pradesh. There are several significant and big markets located at or near Maharaj Bada, some of those are Sarafa Bazaar, Topi Bazaar, Subhash Market named after Subhash Chandra Bose, Nazarbagh Market, Gandhi Market, Daulat Ganj etc. Apart from these big markets, there are several small markets around the Maharaj Bada area. Victoria Market, an old major stationary, books and Garments market, located at Bada, caught fire in June 2010, which also collapsed one portion of the historical Market building. There is a beautiful garden at large chowk, having statue of Maharaj Jiyaji Rao, in the centre of it.

Transport
Maharaj Bada is the centre of the Lashkar area of the city, which holds good portion of city's economy. It is the start and end point of several local transport routes, some of them are-
 Maharaj Bada to Morar via Shinde Ki Chawni, Phoolbagh, Padav, Gwalior railway station, Thatipur via 8 no. Route.
 Maharaj Bada to Hazira via Shinde Ki Chawni, Phoolbagh.
 Maharaj Bada is about 6 km from Gwalior railway station.

References 

Gwalior district